Andreas Zivy (born October 19, 1955) is a Swiss businessman based in Binningen, Switzerland. He is the current chairman of Swiss agribusiness Ameropa Holding AG.

Biography
Zivy was born in Basel in 1955. He completed his school education at Humanistic Secondary School, Basel. He attended Instituts d'études politiques in Paris where he received his master's degree in political science, in 1978. After graduation, Zivy worked for Bunge, in Brazil for two years. In 1980, he joined Ameropa Holding, his family business established in 1948, as the Office Head at Ameropa, France.
In 1986, Zivy became the Vice President of Ameropa AG in Basel. By 1995 he was appointed the CEO of Ameropa AG and a member of the board of directors.

In 2001, Andreas Zivy co-founded the Ameropa Foundation, which is focused on investing in sustainable and progressive charitable programs in the developing world. As of 2010, after the death of his father, Andreas took over as the chairman and the president of Ameropa Holding AG. He is also a former member of the advisory board of the Basel Peace Forum.

Andreas Zivy is a member of the board of the Swiss Democracy Foundation, whose aim it is to defend, promote and develop Democracy in Switzerland and abroad.

Zivy is married, has three children, and lives with his wife in Binningen near Basel.

References

External links
Official website

1955 births
Living people
Businesspeople from Basel-Stadt
Swiss businesspeople
Instituts d'études politiques alumni